is a train station on the Nankō Port Town Line (New Tram) in Suminoe-ku, Osaka, Japan. It literally means "Port Town East".

Layout
There is an elevated island platform with two tracks. The station is completely walled in with glass walls.

Railway stations in Osaka Prefecture
Osaka Metro stations
Railway stations in Japan opened in 1981